Instant Brands Inc. (formerly Double Insight Inc. and Corelle Brands) is a  company selling a range of kitchen appliances. The company was founded by Robert Wang, Yi Quin, and three other Canadian partners in 2009. They are the distributor and designers of the Instant Pot and other products sold under the Instant Brands name.

Its subsidiaries were merged and consolidated under the title "Instant Brands". The company is owned by Cornell Capital LLC and headquartered in Downers Grove, Illinois. Instant Brands and its affiliates design, manufacture and market small kitchen appliances and houseware products worldwide.

The company's original and primary products are electronically controlled, combined pressure cookers and slow cookers. The original cookers are marketed as 6-in-1 or more appliances designed to consolidate the cooking and preparing of food to one device (multicooker). The brand has since expanded to include non-pressure slow cookers, sous-vide immersion circulators, blenders, air fryers, and rice cookers.

History 

In 2008, Robert Wang, Yi Quin, and one other friend, all former employees of Nortel in Ottawa, Canada, started working on designs for the Instant Pot. Wang is credited as the inventor of the Instant Pot.

The company was founded by Robert Wang, Yi Quin, and three other Canadian partners in 2009 as Double Insight.

The company became profitable in 2012, with the Instant Pot as their main product. In 2016, Double Insight sold more than 215,000 Instant Pots on Amazon's Prime Day.

On March 4, 2019, Instant Brands, maker of Instant Pot, announced it had entered into a merger agreement with Corelle Brands and Corelle's chief executive would become chief executive of the merged company while Instant Brands founder Robert Wang will become the merged company's "chief innovative officer". With the merger, Instant Brands is now owned by Cornell Capital LLC and headquartered in Downers Grove, Illinois.

Products and brands

Instant Pot 

The Instant Pot is a Canadian brand of multicookers. The multicookers are electronically controlled, combined pressure cookers and slow cookers.

Instant Pot Accu 
The Instant Pot Accu is a brand of basic and affordable sous-vides sold under the Instant Pot brand.

Instant Ace 
The Instant Ace is a brand of blenders. Products include the Ace, the Ace Nova and the Ace Plus. The blenders feature a digital display that shows the operating temperature along with the remaining cooking time.

Instant Omni 
The Instant Omni and Instant Omni Plus are each a 26L toaster oven.

Instant Vortex Oven 
The Instant Vortex Oven is an alternative to deep frying, replacing the cooking oil with heated circulating air in an oven format.

Instant Vortex Air Fryer 
The Instant Vortex Air Fryer is an alternative to deep frying replacing the cooking oil with heated circulating air.

References 

Kitchenware brands
Companies established in 2009
Companies based in Illinois